Andrew James O'Connor (September 14, 1884 – September 26, 1980) was a Major League Baseball pitcher. In 1 career game, he had a 0–1 record, with a 10.13 ERA. He batted and threw right-handed.

O'Connor was born in Roxbury, Massachusetts, and died in Norwood, Massachusetts.

External links 

1884 births
1980 deaths
Major League Baseball pitchers
New York Highlanders players
Baseball players from Massachusetts
Trenton Tigers players
Johnstown Johnnies players
Altoona Mountaineers players
Montgomery Miners players
New Bedford Whalers (baseball) players